João Maio (24 July 1929 – 10 January 2003) was a Brazilian rower. He competed in the men's coxed pair event at the 1952 Summer Olympics.

References

External links
 

1929 births
2003 deaths
Brazilian male rowers
Olympic rowers of Brazil
Rowers at the 1952 Summer Olympics